1928 Emperor's Cup Final was the 8th final of the Emperor's Cup competition. The final was played at Meiji Jingu Gaien Stadium in Tokyo on October 28, 1928. Kyoto Imperial University won the championship.

Overview
Waseda WMW with Nagayasu Honda and Ko Takamoro on the team, won their 1st title, by defeating Kyoto Imperial University 6–1.

Match details

See also
1928 Emperor's Cup

References

Emperor's Cup
1928 in Japanese football